Trangi Sabir Shah (or Trangri Sabir Shah) is a village and union council (an administrative subdivision) of Mansehra District in Khyber-Pakhtunkhwa province of Pakistan. It is located to the north of the district capital Mansehra.

References

Union councils of Mansehra District
Populated places in Mansehra District